Timi is a village in the Paphos District of Cyprus, located 8 km east of Paphos.

References

Communities in Paphos District